Acrocercops orianassa is a moth of the family Gracillariidae. It is known from Ethiopia and Uganda.

References

orianassa
Moths of Africa
Moths described in 1932
Insects of Uganda
Insects of Ethiopia